Neritilia manoeli is a species of minute freshwater snail with an operculum, an aquatic gastropod mollusc or micromollusk in the family Neritiliidae. 

The survival of this species is threatened by habitat loss. They are found in Principe Island, Sao Tome Island, Bibundi, and Victoria (on aquatic plants). 

The width of the adult shell is 4 mm.

Ecology

Distribution
This species is found on São Tomé and Príncipe and in Cameroon.

Habitat
The ecological habitat for this nerite is inland wetlands, such as rivers.

References

External links

Neritiliidae
Invertebrates of São Tomé and Príncipe
Invertebrates of Cameroon
Gastropods of Africa
Freshwater snails
Gastropods described in 1866
Taxonomy articles created by Polbot